The Bold and the Beautiful is an American television soap opera, created by William J. Bell and Lee Phillip Bell for CBS. It first aired on March 23, 1987. Currently, John McCook (Eric Forrester) and Katherine Kelly Lang (Brooke Logan) are the two longest-running cast members, having appeared on the show when it first aired. The following list is of cast members who are currently on the show: the main cast and recurring, or who are upcoming, returning or departing from the series.

Current cast members

Main cast

Recurring cast

Cast changes

Debuting cast

Previous cast members

See also
List of The Bold and the Beautiful characters

References

External links
 
 
 The Bold and The Beautiful at CBS.com

Lists of actors by soap opera television series